Georges Casanova (26 July 1890 – 20 February 1932) was a French fencer. He won a bronze medal in the team épée event at the 1920 Summer Olympics.

References

External links
 

1890 births
1932 deaths
Sportspeople from Algiers
Pieds-Noirs
French male épée fencers
Olympic fencers of France
Fencers at the 1920 Summer Olympics
Olympic bronze medalists for France
Olympic medalists in fencing
Medalists at the 1920 Summer Olympics
20th-century French people